Ceglédi Kézilabda Klub SE  is a Hungarian handball club from Cegléd, that plays in the  Nemzeti Bajnokság I/B.

Crest, colours, supporters

Naming history

Kit manufacturers and Shirt sponsor
The following table shows in detail Ceglédi KKSE kit manufacturers and shirt sponsors by year:

Kits

Sports Hall information

Name: – Gál József Sportcsarnok
City: – Cegléd
Capacity: – 1046
Address: – 2700 Cegléd, Rákóczi út 33.

Team

Current squad 

Squad for the 2022–23 season

Technical staff
 Head coach:  Károly Nagy
 Assistant coach:  Tamás Neukum
 Goalkeeping coach:  Haris Porobic
 Fitness coach:  Zoltán Kővágó
 Masseur:  Zoltán Tóth
 Club doctor:  Dr. Csaba Elekes

Transfers
Transfers for the 2022–23 season

Joining 

  Bence Bartha (LB) from  Strasbourg Eurométropole HB
  Péter Kende (CB) from  Ferencvárosi TC
  Márton Tóth (CB) from  Veszprém KKFT Felsőörs
  Patrik Markovics (RB) from  BFKA–Veszprém
  Balázs Szűcs (RW) from  BFKA–Veszprém
  Péter Hajdú (LB) from  Salgótarjáni SKC
  Tamás Aleksza (GK) from  NEKA
  Iman Jamali (LB) from  Dinamo București

Leaving 

  Norbert Tóth (LB) (retires)
  Norbert Gyene (RW) to  KK Ajka
  Patrik Tóth (CB) to  KK Ajka

Previous Squads

Honours

Recent seasons

 Seasons in Nemzeti Bajnokság I: 15
 Seasons in Nemzeti Bajnokság I/B: 27
 Seasons in Nemzeti Bajnokság II: 14

EHF Ranking

Former club members

Notable former players

 László Bartucz
 Balázs Bíró
 Tamás Borsos
 Dániel Bősz
 Norbert Gyene
 Márk Hegedűs
 Iman Jamali (2022–)
 Milorad Krivokapić
 Ádám Országh
 Péter Pallag
 Ákos Pásztor
 Ákos Sandor
 Norbert Sutka
 István Szepesi
 Edmond Tóth
 Bence Zakics
 Marko Davidovic
 Tarik Vranac
 Tomislav Radnić
 Bruno-Vili Zobec
 Misael Iglesias
 José Savon
 Atsushi Mekaru
 Vladan Abramović
 Božo Anđelić
 Marko Čampar
 Nemanja Grbović
 Ivan Perišić
 Mirko Radović
 Mirko Vujović
 Costică Buceschi (2002–2003)
 Marius Novanc (2001–2002)
 Uroš Elezović
 Luka Karanović
 Milos Mojsilov
 Milan Vučković
 Martin Mazak
 Jakub Mikita

References

External links
  
 

Hungarian handball clubs
Cegléd